Yttrium oxalate is an inorganic compound, a salt of yttrium and oxalic acid with the chemical formula Y(CO). The compound does not dissolve in water and forms crystalline hydrates—colorless crystals.

Synthesis 
Precipitation of soluble yttrium salts with oxalic acid:

Properties 
Yttrium oxalate is highly insoluble in water and converts to the oxide when heated. Yttrium oxalate forms crystalline hydrates (colorless crystals) with the formula Y(CO)•n HO, where n = 4, 9, and 10.

Decomposes when heated:

The solubility product of yttrium oxalate at 25 °C is 5.1 × 10−30.

The trihydrate Y(CO)•3HO is formed by heating more hydrated varieties at 110 °C.

Y(CO)•2HO, which is formed by heating the decahydrate at 210 °C) forms monoclinic crystals with unit cell dimensions a=9.3811 Å, b=11.638 Å, c=5.9726 Å, β=96.079°.

Related 
Several yttrium oxalate double salts are known containing additional cations. Also a mixed-anion compound with carbonate is known.

References 

Inorganic compounds
Yttrium compounds
Oxalates